Carnival Rock is a 1957 film directed by Roger Corman with musical performances by The Platters, David Houston, Bob Luman and His Shadows, and the Blockbusters.

Plot

A nightclub owner, Christopher 'Christy' Cristakos, falls in love with the club's singer, Natalie Cook. However, the singer is in love with Stanley, a local businessman/gangster. After the gangster wins control of the club, Cristakos, the previous owner, begins to perform comic routines between the acts at the night club as part of his (Cristakos) plan to win Natalie back. Eventually, the gangster and the singer marry, which causes the previous owner to leave alone.

Cast
Brian Hutton as Stanley
Susan Cabot as Natalie
David J. Stewart as Christopher 'Christy' Cristakos
Dick Miller as Ben
Jonathan Haze as Max
Ed Nelson as Cannon
Chris Alcaide as Slug

Original TV play
The film was based on a one-hour TV play written by Leo Lieberman, called Carnival at Midnight. It was an episode of Climax! and aired on 3 January 1957. Jack Smight directed.

Original cast
Buddy Ebsen as Ben
Peter Graves as Stanley
Oskar Homolka as Christy Christakos
Debra Paget as Natalie

Production
Roger Corman had previously made Rock All Night (1956), an earlier low budget film based on a TV play which featured musical acts. It was successful relative to its budget and Corman made this similar film for a syndicate of theatre owners.

Filming started in May 1957 at Ziv Studios. Susan Cabot was borrowed from Universal, whom she was under contract to at the time.

Music in the film was from The Platters, David Houston, Bob Luman, The Shadows and The Blockbusters, most of whom appear in the movie as themselves.

Songs
The Platters and the Blockbusters – "Remember When"
David Houston – "One and Only", "Teenage Frankie and Johnny"
Susan Cabot and the Blockbusters – "Ou Shoo Bla De" and "There's No Place Without You"
Bob Luman and the Shadows – "This Is the Night", "All Night Long"
The Blockbusters – "Rock a Boogie"
The Shadows – "The Creep"

Reception
Variety found that Miller and Cabot turned in good performances, stated Corman did a fair job as producer and a better job as director and found the movie had overtones of Pagliacci mixed with Rock and Roll.

Frank found the included music in the film the high point of the movie.

Cabot would go on to make a number of films for Corman.

References

External links

Carnival Rock at Letterbox DVD
Complete film at Internet Archive
Complete press book

1957 films
1957 drama films
American drama films
Films directed by Roger Corman
1950s English-language films
Films produced by Roger Corman
1950s American films